Péter Hédervári (1931-1984) was a geophysicist, scientific popularizer, amateur astronomer, and member of several national and international scientific societies.

Career 
After receiving his doctorate at Eötvös Loránd University, Budapest he served on the staff of the Eötvös Loránd Geophysical Institute from 1952 to 1963. From 1968, on he was a columnist with the weekly magazine Élet és Tudomány (Life and Science).

His specialty was the geology of the earth's moon and earth-like planets. His articles on these subjects appeared in the Fizikai Szemle (Physics Review), Magyar Fizikai Folyóirat (Hungarian Journal of Physics), Földrajzi Közlemények (Geographical Bulletin), and Földtani Közlöny (Bulletin of the Hungarian Geological Society). Several foreign journals also published his articles. A crater near the lunar south pole is named after him (Hédervári crater).

Major works 
 A Hold fizikája. 1962
 Erök és energiák a Föld életében. 1963
 Földszerkezet és földrengések.1966
 Amiről a Föld mesél. 1967
 Amiről a Hold mesél. 1969
 A Hold és meghóditása. 1970
 A Görög Pompeji: egy vulkán régészete. 1972
 Az óceán fogjai. 1973
 A Jávai tekercsek. 1975
 A Vénusz és a Mars ostroma. 1976. (with Marik Miklós and Pécsi Tamás)
 Mi újság a Földön. 1980
 Csillagunk a Nap. 1980
 Évezredek, vulkánok, emberek.1981
 Naprendszeren innen és túl. 1983
 Üstökös kutatás az űrkorszakban. 1983
 Képes csillagvilág. 1984
 Ismeretlen Naprendszerünk. 1986
 Vulkánkitörések más égitesteken. Földrajzi Közlöny 1959/1.

References

Hungarian scientists
Hungarian writers